Marissa Stott (born 13 June ) is an actress who currently resides in Berlin, Germany.

One of her most memorable roles was on New Zealand's medical soap opera Shortland Street where in 2005 she played Amanda Warner, twin sister to Dr. Chris Warner.

Marissa is also a skilled voice artist. She has done numerous radio ad campaigns and does regular voice work for La-Z-Boy.

Filmography

Film

Television

Music videos

External links
 
 http://www.voiceovers.co.nz/
 https://web.archive.org/web/20080803223916/http://screenworks.co.nz/Doves_of_War/Doves_of_War_home_Actors.htm

Living people
New Zealand voice actresses
New Zealand film actresses
New Zealand television actresses
Year of birth missing (living people)
New Zealand soap opera actresses
20th-century New Zealand actresses
21st-century New Zealand actresses